

Dinosaurs
 On 21 June, Gideon Algernon Mantell displays his Iguanodon fossils to the Geological Society, but arouses little interest.

Plesiosaurs

New taxa

References

1820s in paleontology
Paleontology